Nahuel Hernán Losada (born 17 April 1993) is an Argentinian professional footballer who plays as a goalkeeper for the Primera Nacional club Belgrano.

Career 

He was born on 17 April 1993 in Berisso, in the Province of Buenos Aires. He made the lower divisions in the Estudiantes de La Plata. With no place in the Estudiantes team, he was loaned to Unión de Mar del Plata for the whole of the 2015 season.

References

External links
 

1993 births
Living people
Argentine footballers
Argentine expatriate footballers
Association football goalkeepers
All Boys footballers
Estudiantes de La Plata footballers
Unión de Mar del Plata footballers
Club Atlético Atlanta footballers
Deportivo Pasto footballers
Argentine Primera División players
Primera Nacional players
Primera B Metropolitana players
Categoría Primera A players
Argentine expatriate sportspeople in Colombia
Expatriate footballers in Colombia
People from Berisso
Sportspeople from Buenos Aires Province